Sabhash Raja is a 1961 Indian Telugu-language drama film, produced by Sundarlal Nahatha, Doondy under the Rajasri Productions banner and directed by P. S. Ramakrishna Rao. It stars Akkineni Nageswara Rao and Rajasulochana, with music composed by Ghantasala.

Plot 
The film begins on Raghu (Kanta Rao) a millionaire, leads a happy family life with his wife Sarala (Devika) and a son. Raghu has a younger brother Raja (Akkineni Nageswara Rao) who ran away from the house in their childhood by admitting Raghu's misdeeds. At present, he is a pick-pocketer, accompanying a friend Miriyalu (Relangi) and falls for a street dancer Rani (Rajasulochana). Once Raghu visits his branch office where malicious Manager Madhu (Nagabhushanam) ensnares him with his girlfriend Manorama (Girija) and habituates all sorts of vices. There onwards, he starts neglecting his family and leaves them on roads. At a point in time, Raja snatches Raghu's pursue in which he notices their childhood photo along with Raghu's marriage photo and understands the reality. At that juncture, Raghu refuses to accept Raja as he has a share in the property. Eventually, Sarala in search of her husband lands in the city when Raja recognizes and gives her shelter without revealing his identity. Meanwhile, Madhu sees a dance performance of Rani and aspires to possess her, so, he lures her father Tata with money also fabricates him that Raja & Sarala has an illicit relationship. Believing it, Tata insults them when inflamed Raja divulges the truth. Right now, Raja decides to reform his brother, so, he joins Sarala as a maid in his house. Parallelly, learning that Raja is a thief, Rani shows her hatred, so, perform penance he surrenders himself to Police. Before leaving he entrusts the responsibility of Sarala to Miriyalu & Rani. By the time, Madhu & Manorama are planning to escape with the money. Spotting it, Miriyalu & Rani bars them, in that scramble, Madhu locks Rani in Raghu's room and flees when Miriyalu makes them caught by police. Being cognizant of it, Tata acquits Raja on bail and immediately they rush to Raghu's house. Thereupon, Raja observes drunkard Raghu trying to molest Rani as he is fed-up with his brother's offenses, enraged Raja tries to kill him when Sarala obstructs his way. At last, Raghu realizes his mistake and pleads pardon. Finally, the movie ends on a happy note with the marriage of Raja & Rani.

Cast 
Akkineni Nageswara Rao as Raja
Rajasulochana as Rani
Kanta Rao as Raghu
Devika as Sarala
Relangi as Miriyalu
Nagabhushanam as Madhu
Girija as Manorama
Meena Kumari as Jamuna

Soundtrack 

Music composed by Ghantasala.

References 

Indian drama films
Films scored by Ghantasala (musician)
1961 drama films
1961 films